Janet B. Johnson (March 5, 1940 – August 21, 1999) was an American politician.

Born in The Bronx, New York City, New York, Johnson moved to Minnesota in 1960 and went to University of Minnesota. Johnson was a business owner. She served on the North Branch, Minnesota School Board and was involved with the Democratic Party. Johnson served in the Minnesota State Senate from 1991 until her death in 1999. Johnson died of brain cancer in a hospital in Saint Paul, Minnesota.

Notes

1940 births
1999 deaths
Politicians from the Bronx
People from North Branch, Minnesota
University of Minnesota alumni
Businesspeople from Minnesota
Women state legislators in Minnesota
School board members in Minnesota
Democratic Party Minnesota state senators
Deaths from brain cancer in the United States
Deaths from cancer in Minnesota
Neurological disease deaths in Minnesota
20th-century American women politicians
20th-century American politicians
20th-century American businesspeople